David Matos Simas (born January 5, 1970) is an American lawyer, former government official, and a former politician. He is the CEO of the Obama Foundation and served in Barack Obama's administration as the White House Director of Political Affairs from 2014 to 2016.

Early life and education
Simas was born and raised in Taunton, Massachusetts, the son of Portuguese American immigrant parents, Antonio and Deolinda Simas. Simas lost two of her fingers in a faulty machine at the silver factory where she worked when Simas was a child. The Portuguese immigrant lawyer who worked on the case inspired Simas to become a lawyer. He attended Coyle and Cassidy High School and earned a Bachelor of Arts degree from Stonehill College. He later earned a Juris Doctor from the Boston College Law School in 1995.

Career
Simas began his political career working as an intern in Senator Edward M. Kennedy's office in 1989. He was later elected to the Taunton School Board in 1993 and the Taunton City Council in 1997 and 1999. He later served as president of the council and worked as an advisor to the mayor of Taunton.

After leaving the city council he served as an assistant register of deeds for the Northern district office of the Bristol County Registry of Deeds. He was later elected as the new Register of Deeds of the Northern district of Bristol County in 2004. He won reelection in 2006 but later resigned to accept a position in Governor Deval Patrick's administration.

He formerly served as deputy general counsel to the Massachusetts House of Representatives Post Audit and Oversight Bureau and practiced law with the law firm of Gay & Gay Associates, PC.

He worked as deputy chief of staff to Massachusetts Governor Deval Patrick from 2007 until 2009. In 2009, he joined the Obama White House as a deputy assistant to the president, working under Senior Advisor David Axelrod.  

He worked as director of opinion research for President Obama's 2012 re-election campaign and then served as a liaison between the president and Democratic officials for two and a half years.

Simas was appointed CEO of the Obama Foundation in December 2016.

Personal life
Simas married his high school sweetheart, Shauna. They have two daughters and live in Hyde Park in Chicago.

References

External links 

 Letter from David Simas, CEO - The Obama Foundation

|-

1970 births
American political consultants
Barack Obama 2008 presidential campaign
Boston College Law School alumni
Living people
Obama administration personnel
Politicians from Chicago
Politicians from Taunton, Massachusetts
Stonehill College alumni
21st-century American lawyers
20th-century American lawyers
20th-century American politicians
21st-century American politicians
Massachusetts lawyers